Ilybius montanus is a species of beetle native to Europe and North Africa. In Europe, it is found in Belgium, Bosnia and Herzegovina, Great Britain (incl. Isle of Man, Corsica, mainland Denmark, mainland France, Germany, IrelandLithuania, Poland, mainland Portugal, Sardinia, Sicily, mainland Spain, and the Netherlands.

References

montanus
Beetles described in 1828